Below is a detailed list of the ships and submarines built in Barrow-in-Furness, England by the Barrow Shipbuilding Company, Vickers-Armstrongs, Vickers Shipbuilding and Engineering, BAE Systems Marine, BAE Systems Submarine Solutions or any other descendant companies. Whilst it is extensive it is incomplete as there are some commercial vessels missing from the list.

373 merchant ships, 312 submarines and 148 naval surface ships have been built in Barrow (for navies and companies based in the likes of Argentina, Australia, Brazil, Canada, France, India, Japan, Netherlands, Russia, United Kingdom, United States).

All but three nuclear submarines of the Royal Navy were built in Barrow, including the latest class of fleet submarines currently under construction by BAE Systems Submarine Solutions, utilising the massive Devonshire Dock Hall.

(the first submarine in the world to fire a live torpedo underwater),  (the most successful Royal Navy submarine of World War II) and the 103,000-ton oil tanker British Admiral (once the world's largest ship) were also built in Barrow, as were a number of ocean liners for Cunard Line, Inman Line, Orient Line and P&O.

Active vessels
As of 2019, the following ships and submarines built in Barrow are active in service around the world.
  – Frigate of the Islamic Republic of Iran Navy (Commissioned in 1971)
  – Type 42 destroyer of the Argentine Navy (Commissioned in 1976)
  – Amphibious transport dock of the Royal Navy (Commissioned in 2003)
  – Submarine of the Royal Navy (Commissioned in 2013)
  – Submarine of the Royal Navy (Commissioned in 2016)
  – Submarine of the Royal Navy (Commissioned in 2010)
  – Amphibious transport dock of the Royal Navy (Commissioned in 2004)
  – Frigate of the Islamic Republic of Iran Navy (Commissioned in 1971)
  – Submarine of the Royal Navy (Commissioned in 1990)
  – Submarine of the Royal Navy (Commissioned in 1989)
  – Submarine of the Royal Navy (Commissioned in 1991)
  – Submarine of the Royal Navy (Commissioned in 1993)
  – Submarine of the Royal Navy (Commissioned in 1999)
  – Submarine of the Royal Navy (Commissioned in 1995)
  – Submarine of the Royal Navy (Commissioned in 1996)
  – Fleet tanker of the Royal Fleet Auxiliary (Commissioned in 2003)

Inactive preserved vessels
  – Preserved at the Royal Navy Submarine Museum in Gosport, United Kingdom
 HMS Churchill – Laid up in Rosyth Dockyard, United Kingdom
  – Laid up in Rosyth Dockyard, United Kingdom
 INS Gal – Preserved at the Clandestine Immigration and Naval Museum in Haifa, Israel
  – Preserved at the Royal Navy Submarine Museum in Gosport, United Kingdom
  – Museum ship in Yokosuka, Japan
  – Preserved at the Estonian Maritime Museum in Tallinn, Estonia
 HMS Resolution – Laid up in Rosyth Dockyard, United Kingdom
 HMS Repulse – Laid up in Rosyth Dockyard, United Kingdom
  – Preserved at the Navy Cultural Centre in Rio de Janeiro, Brazil
 HMS Swiftsure – Laid up in Rosyth Dockyard, United Kingdom

All vessels

Military ships

Submarines
See here for every U-class submarine built in Barrow-in-Furness for the British, French, Netherlands, Polish and Soviet Navies.

Civilian ships

Ocean liners and passenger ships

Oil, gas and LNG tankers

Cargo ships and other vessels

Key facts
 The largest ship ever to be built in Barrow was the 103,000-ton oil tanker British Admiral. She was the first of her size to ever be built in Britain and even held the title of being the world's largest ship for a short time.
She had a speed capable of reaching , and was also the first liner to be fitted with transverse propulsion.
 The largest navy ship built in Barrow was Battleship . Her Full load displacement was just over 36,000 tons.
 The largest loss of life on a Barrow-built ship was on 28 November 1942, when  acting as a troop ship during World War II was torpedoed off the coast of South Africa by a German submarine, killing 858. This is closely followed by the events of 9 July 1917, when 843 men were killed in the UK's worst ever explosion on board .
 The most recent Barrow-built vessel to be lost during a military campaign occurred in 1982 during the Falkland War when  was attacked and sunk by the Argentine Navy.
 The first ship to be built in Barrow was Jane Roper, which was launched in 1852, and Barrow's first steamship, a 3,000-ton liner named Duke of Devonshire, was launched in 1873.
 The most successful British submarine of World War II was built in Barrow.  completed 24 patrols, sinking around 120,000 tons of enemy shipping, including the  after the Battle of the Duisburg Convoy and the 18,000-ton Italian liner .

Notables to launch vessels

20th century
 Elizabeth II
 British Admiral
 
 
 
 
 Winston Churchill
 
 Princess Diana
 
 Queen Elizabeth The Queen Mother
 RMS Strathmore
 Princess Alexandra
 SS Oriana
 Princess Louise
 
 Prince Arisugawa Takehito

21st century
 Princess Anne
 
 Camilla, Duchess of Cornwall
 
 Purnomo Yusgiantoro
 KRI Bung Tomo (recommissioned)
 KRI John Lie (recommissioned)

See also
 Royal Navy Submarine Service
 List of submarines of the Royal Navy

References

External links
 Dock Museum Vessels Archive
 Vessels built at VSEL from 1946–present

 
Lists of ships of the United Kingdom
Ships
Lists of submarines